Blow down may refer to:

 Boiler blowdown, periodic release of water from a boiler to remove accumulated impurities
 Windthrow, trees uprooted or broken by wind